The geography of Mozambique consists mostly of coastal lowlands with uplands in its center and high plateaus in the northwest. There are also mountains in the western portion. The country is located on the east coast of southern Africa, directly west of the island of Madagascar. Mozambique has a tropical climate with two seasons, a wet season from October to March and a dry season from April to September.

Physical features

The Coast
The coastline extends from 26° 52′ S. to 10° 40′ S., and from south to north makes a double curve with a general trend outward to the east.

The southern coastline is characterized by sandy beaches backed by coastal dunes. Behind the coastal dunes are lagoons, including river estuaries, closed saline lagoons, and salt lakes. The land then turns outward to Cape Correntes, a little north of which is Inhambane Bay. Bending westward again and passing the Bazaruto Archipelago of several small islands, of which the chief is Bazaruto.

Mozambique's central coast, from Bazaruto Island north to Angoche Island, is known as the Bight of Sofala or Sofala Bay. It is also known as the Swamp Coast, and is  characterized by extensive mangrove swamps and coastal wetlands. As in the south, the coastline is generally low, and harbours are few and poor. Beira is the principal seaport on the central coast, with rail and highway links to the interior.

Several large rivers, including the Save, Pungwe, and Zambezi, create coastal estuaries and river deltas, of which the Zambezi delta is the largest. North of the Zambezi, the small coralline islands of the Primeiras and Segundas Archipelago lie parallel to the coast.

The northern coast is much indented, abounding in rocky headlands and rugged cliffs, with an almost continuous fringe of islands. On one of these islands is Mozambique, and immediately north of that port is Conducia Bay. Somewhat farther north are two large bays, Fernao Veloso Bay and Memba Bay. Nacala on Fernao  Veloso Bay is the principal seaport on the northern coast, with a rail link to Malawi and the coalfields of northwestern Mozambique. North of Fernao Veloso and Memba bays is Pemba Bay, where there is commodious anchorage for heavy draught vessels. North of Pemba Bay the Quirimbas Islands lie offshore, and numerous bays and estuaries indent the coast. Cape Delgado, the northernmost point on Mozambique's coast, is part of the delta of the Ruvuma River, which forms Mozambique's border with Tanzania.

The northern coast is part of the East African coral coast, a marine ecoregion that extends along the coasts of northern Mozambique, Tanzania, and Kenya. Along the northern coast the Mozambique Current, which flows south between Madagascar and the continent is close to the coast and scours out all the softer material, while at the same time the corals are building in deep waters.

A recent global remote sensing analysis suggested that there were 2,029km² of tidal flats in Mozambique, making it the 16th ranked country in terms of how much tidal flat occurs there.

Orography
Orographically the backbone of the country is the mountain chain which forms the eastern escarpment of the continental plateau. It does not present a uniformly abrupt descent to the plains, but in places, as in the lower Zambezi district, slopes gradually to the coast. The Lebombo Mountains, behind Delagoa Bay, nowhere exceed  in height. The Manica Plateau, farther north between the Save and Zambezi rivers, is higher, rising towards the Eastern Highlands along the border with Zimbabwe. Monte Binga, on the border with Zimbabwe, is Mozambique's highest peak. Mount Gorongosa lies north-east of the Manica Plateau, and is, like it, of granitic formation. Gorongosa, rising isolated with precipitous outer slopes, has been likened in its aspect to a frowning citadel. East of Gorongosa a graben valley extends from the Zambezi to Pungwe Bay, the southern extension of the African Rift Valley. The Cheringoma Plateau lies east of the graben, sloping gently towards the coast.

The country between Malawi and Ibo is remarkable for the number of fantastically-shaped granite peaks, or inselbergs, which rise from the plateau. 

The plateau lands west of the escarpment are of moderate elevation – perhaps averaging . It is, however, only along the Zambezi and north of that river that Mozambique's territory reaches to the continental plateau. This northern plain has been categorised by the World Wildlife Fund as part of the Eastern miombo woodlands ecoregion.

Rivers

The other Mozambican rivers with considerable drainage areas are the Komati, Save, Buzi, and Pungwe south of the Zambezi, and the Licungo (Likungo), Ligonha, Lúrio, Montepuez (Montepuesi or Mtepwesi), Messalo (or Msalu), and Ruvuma (or Rovuma) with its affluent the Lugenda (or Lujenda), north of the Zambezi.

Cataracts entirely prevent navigation above this point.
Its general direction through Mozambique is east by north. At its mouth it forms a delta  in extent.

The Buzi and Pungwe are streams north of and similar in character to the Save. The port of Beira is at the mouth of the Pungwe.

Of the north-Zambezi streams the Licungo, rising in the hills south-east of Lake Chilwa, flows south and enters the ocean not far north of Quelimane. The Montepurez and the Messalo drain the country between the Lúrio and Ruvuma basins. Their banks are in general well-defined and the wet season rise seems fairly constant.

Somali Plate
Geologists have divided the Phanerozoic era of Mozambique's geology into the Karoo and post-Karoo era. This terminology is mostly used pertaining to studies of the structural and stratigraphic composition of rocks in the Zambezi valley. Mozambique entirely lies within the Somali Plate.

Climate 

Mozambique has a tropical climate with two seasons, a wet season from October to March and a dry season from April to September. Climatic conditions vary depending on altitude. Rainfall is heavy along the coast and decreases in the north and south. 

Cyclones are also common during the wet season.

Facts 
Area:
total:

land:
786,380 km²
water:
13,000 km²

Capital
Maputo (Lourenço Marques)

Major Cities
Matola
Nampula
Beira
Chimoio
Nacala
Quelimane
Tete
Lichinga
Pemba (Porto Amelia)

Other Cities
Angoche (António Enes)

Land boundaries:
total: 4,571 km
border countries:
Malawi 1,569 km, South Africa 491 km, Eswatini 105 km, Tanzania 756 km, Zambia 419 km, Zimbabwe 1,231 km

Coastline:
2,470 km

Maritime claims:
territorial sea:

exclusive economic zone:
 and 

Elevation extremes:
lowest point:
Indian Ocean 0 m
highest point:
Monte Binga 2 436 m

Natural resources:
coal, titanium, natural gas, hydropower, tantalum, graphite

Land use:
arable land:
6.51% (2011), 5.43% (2005 est.), 3.98% (1998 est.)
permanent crops:
0.25% (2011), 0.29% (2005 est.), 0.29% (1998 est.)
other:
93.24% (2011), 94.28% (2005 est.), 95.73% (1998 est.)

Irrigated land:
 (2003)

Total renewable water resources:
217.1 km3 (2011)

Natural hazards:
severe droughts; devastating cyclones and floods occur in central and southern provinces

Environment – current issues:
a long civil war and recurrent drought in the hinterlands have resulted in increased migration of the population to urban and coastal areas with adverse environmental consequences; desertification; pollution of surface and coastal waters; elephant poaching for ivory is a problem

Environment – international agreements:
party to:
Biodiversity, Climate Change, Climate Change-Kyoto Protocol, Desertification, Endangered Species, Hazardous Wastes, Law of the Sea, Ozone Layer Protection, Ship Pollution, Wetlands

Ecoregions
 Eastern miombo woodlands
 Eastern Zimbabwe montane forest–grassland mosaic
 Maputaland coastal forest mosaic
 Southern miombo woodlands
 Southern Rift montane forest–grassland mosaic
 Southern Zanzibar–Inhambane coastal forest mosaic
 Zambezian coastal flooded savanna
 Zambezian flooded grasslands
 Zambezian halophytics
 Zambezian and mopane woodlands
 East African mangroves

Extreme points

This is a list of the extreme points of Mozambique, the points that are farther north, south, east or west than any other location.

 Northernmost point – Mouth of the Rovuma River, Cabo Delgado Province
 Easternmost point – unnamed headland east of the village of Amade, Nampula Province
 Southernmost point – unnamed location on the border with South Africa east of the South African town of Mosi, Maputo Province
 Westernmost point – the point where the border with Zambia enters the Luangwa river, Tete Province

See also
Mozambique
Monte Muambe
Volcanoes of Mozambique

References

External links
 Mozambique. The World Factbook. Central Intelligence Agency.
 Weather in Mozambique from Free Tourist Information
 Mozambique Geography from Southern Africa Places
 Mozambique - Geography and Environment from Oxfam's "Cool Planet"
 Integrated geological interpretation of remotely sensed data to support geological mapping in Mozambique 
 

 

sv:Moçambique#Geogramfi